Lauro Toneatto (born 21 January 1933 in Udine, Friuli–Venezia Giulia, died 13 May 2010 in Siena) was an Italian footballer and coach.

Biography 

Lauro Toneatto played as a defender. He started his career at Empoli, played eight seasons at Siena, winning the Italian fourth level in 1956.

He was coach for 22 seasons at 12 clubs (Siena, Bari, Pisa, Foggia, Arezzo, Cagliari, Sambenedettese, Sampdoria, Pistoiese, Taranto and Reggiana). He won Serie C in 1967 with Bari and Serie B in 1973 with Foggia.

Clubs

As player 
 1952-1954 : Empoli FC
 1955-1963 : AC Siena

As coach 
 1964-1966 : AC Siena
 1966-1969 : AS Bari
 1969-1970 : Pisa
 1970-1972 : AS Bari
 1972-1975 : US Foggia
 1975-1976 : AC Arezzo
 1976-1978 : Cagliari Calcio
 1978-1979 : Sambenedettese
 1979-1980 : U.C. Sampdoria
 1980-1981 : Pisa
 1981-1982 : AC Pistoiese
 1982-1983 : Taranto Sport
 1983-1984 : AC Reggiana
 1984-1985 : Taranto Sport
 1985-1986 : Ternana Calcio

Honours

As player 
 Lega Pro Seconda Divisione
 Champion in 1956

As coach 
 Serie B
 Champion in 1973
 Lega Pro Prima Divisione
 Champion in 1967

References 

People from Udine
Italian footballers
Serie C players
Empoli F.C. players
A.C.N. Siena 1904 players
Italian football managers
Cagliari Calcio managers
S.S.C. Bari managers
1933 births
2010 deaths
Association football defenders